Ian Kenny (born 30 March 1993) is an Irish hurler who plays for Waterford Senior Championship club Ballygunner and at inter-county level with the Waterford senior hurling team. He usually lines out as a right corner-back.

Honours

Ballygunner
Munster Senior Club Hurling Championship (1): 2018
Waterford Senior Hurling Championship (6): 2015, 2016, 2017, 2018, 2019, 2020

References

1993 births
Living people
Ballygunner hurlers
Waterford inter-county hurlers